Seyyed Kandi may refer to:
 Seyyed Kandi, Germi, Ardabil Province
 Seyyed Kandi, Meshgin Shahr, Ardabil Province
 Seyyed Kandi, East Azerbaijan
 Seyyed Kandi, Zanjan